Tritonoturris is a genus of sea snails, marine gastropod mollusks in the family Raphitomidae.

Species
Species within the genus Tritonoturris include:
 Tritonoturris albocingulata Stahlschmidt, Chino & E. Tardy, 2022
 Tritonoturris amabilis (Hinds, 1843)
 Tritonoturris capensis (Smith E. A., 1882)
 Tritonoturris cumingii (Powys, 1835)
 Tritonoturris difficilis Stahlschmidt, Poppe & Tagaro, 2018
 Tritonoturris homologis Stahlschmidt, Chino & E. Tardy, 2022
 Tritonoturris lifouana (Hervier, 1897) 
 Tritonoturris macandrewi (Smith E. A., 1882)
 Tritonoturris menecharmes (Melvill, 1923)
 Tritonoturris obesa Kilburn, 1977
 Tritonoturris oxyclathrus (Martens, 1880)
 Tritonoturris paucicostata (Pease, 1860)
 Tritonoturris phaula Kilburn, 1977
 Tritonoturris poppei Vera-Pelaez & Vega-Luz, 1999
 Tritonoturris scalaris (Hinds, 1843)
 Tritonoturris secta (Sowerby, G.B. II, 1870)
 Tritonoturris sottoae Stahlschmidt, Poppe & Tagaro, 2018
 Tritonoturris subrissoides (Hervier, 1897)
Species brought into synonymy
 Tritonoturris buccinoides Shuto, 1983: synonym of Pleurotomella buccinoides (Shuto, 1983) (original combination)
 Tritonoturris concinnus Li & Li, 2007: synonym of Tritonoturris scalaris (Hinds, 1843)
 Tritonoturris elegans (Pease, 1860): synonym of Tritonoturris amabilis (Hinds, 1843)
 Tritonoturris harpa Pease, 1860: synonym of Tritonoturris cumingii (Powys, 1835)
 Tritonoturris phanula Kilburn, 1977 : synonym of Tritonoturris phaula Kilburn, 1977
 Tritonoturris robillardi (H. Adams, 1869): synonym of Tritonoturris amabilis (Hinds, 1843)
 Tritonoturris tritonoides Reeve, 1843: synonym of Tritonoturris cumingii (Powys, 1835)

References

External links
 Dall W.H. (1924). Notes on molluscan nomenclature. Proceedings of the Biological Society of Washington. 37: 87-90
  Powell A.W.B.(1966) The molluscan families Speightiidae and Turridae: an evaluation of the valid taxa, both recent and fossil, with lists of characteristic species; Bulletin of the Auckland Institute and Museum ; no. 5
 Bouchet, P.; Kantor, Y. I.; Sysoev, A.; Puillandre, N. (2011). A new operational classification of the Conoidea (Gastropoda). Journal of Molluscan Studies. 77(3): 273-308
 
 Worldwide Mollusc Species Data Base: Raphitomidae

 
Raphitomidae
Gastropod genera